Tower Of Rome was a grindcore band from South Holland, Illinois, that first formed in 2002. After releasing a demo through the music sharing website HardcoreMP3.com, the band were signed onto Hewhocorrupts' label in June 2004 after meeting the group at a live show, who released their two albums All Is Lost...All Is Lost...All Is Yet To Be Found (November 16, 2004) and World War 1 (June 6, 2006). The group toured with Stand Before the Firing Squad across the United States in 2005, and they have also performed with acts such as Melt-Banana and Daughters. The group intended to tour Europe in the summer of 2006, however it was cancelled due to van failure.

The group announced a hiatus in late 2006, citing reasons such as equipment destroyed in a flood, van failure, and multiple cancelled shows. The band would eventually reunite in 2007, even performing at Dude Fest 2007. The band has been, however, inactive since. Members have since gone on to bands such as Sorespot, CSTVT, and Sea Of Shit.

Members
Joshua Snader - vocals
Tony Marzilli - guitar
Mike Serrano - bass
Aaron Guitierrez - drums

Discography
Studio albums
All Is Lost...All Is Lost...All Is Yet To Be Found (2004, Hewhocorrupts, inc)
World War 1 (2006, Hewhocorrupts, inc)

Splits
Tower Of Rome/Gun Kata (2005, Sonic Deadline)

Demos
Tower Of Rome (2003, self-released)

Compilations
Discography (2019, Wax Vessel)

References

External links
 Myspace page
 Video interview with Tower Of Rome

American grindcore musical groups
Musical groups from Illinois
Musical groups established in 2002
Musical groups disestablished in 2007